Liao Hui (born October 5, 1987 in Xiantao, Hubei) is a former Chinese weightlifter, Olympic champion and three time world champion.

Before the International Weightlifting Federation reorganized the categories, he held all three world records in the 69 kg class.

Career
In 2007 at the 6th Chinese City Games he broke two junior world records and won gold in the 69 kg class. At the 2008 Summer Olympics in Beijing he won the gold medal in the 69 kg class with a total of 348 kg. In 2009 and 2013 he won the World Weightlifting Championships. He also won the 2010 World Weightlifting Championships before being retroactively disqualified for performance-enhancing drug use the following year.

Liao became a member of the national weightlifting team in early 2007. After breaking two junior world records in 2007, he became a candidate for the Chinese national team at the 2008 Olympics after previously having been a backup for the 2012 Summer Olympics. He replaced Zhang Guozheng, the gold medalist in the 69 kg class at the 2004 Summer Olympics. Liao won the Olympic gold medal in the 69 kg class at the 2008 Olympics by lifting 158 kg in the snatch and 190 kg in the clean and jerk for a total of 348 kg.

Liao won the gold medal in the 69 kg class at the 2009 World Weightlifting Championships, achieving a 346 kg total.

At the 2010 World Weightlifting Championships, Liao placed first and broke the world records for both the clean and jerk and the total in the 69 kg class by lifting 198 kg and 358 kg, respectively. However, in November 2011, the International Weightlifting Federation announced that Liao had tested positive for the banned substances boldenone and androstatrienedione. As a result, the IWF subsequently disqualified Liao from the 2010 WWC, revoking his gold medals and invalidating his record-breaking lifts. Liao was initially banned from competition until September 30, 2014 but his ban was reduced to September, 2012 because it was a first time offense.

Liao competed for China in the 69 kg class at the 2013 World Weightlifting Championships, winning the gold with the highest snatch, clean and jerk, and total. He set new records in the snatch and total at the 2014 World Weightlifting Championships in Almaty, Kazakhstan. His performance at this competition, a total of 359 kg at 68.68 kg bodyweight, earned him a Sinclair of 478.56, the best to date from a Chinese weightlifter.

Major results

References 

 

1987 births
Living people
Olympic gold medalists for China
Olympic weightlifters of China
People from Xiantao
Weightlifters at the 2008 Summer Olympics
World record holders in Olympic weightlifting
Olympic medalists in weightlifting
Chinese sportspeople in doping cases
Doping cases in weightlifting
Weightlifters from Hubei
Medalists at the 2008 Summer Olympics
Chinese male weightlifters
World Weightlifting Championships medalists
21st-century Chinese people